Liechtenstein Olympic Committee is the National Olympic Committee representing Liechtenstein. Before the organisation was renamed in 2013 it was called "Liechtensteinischer Olympischer Sportverband" (LOSV).

Establishment 
The motive to establish a National Olympic Committee for Liechtenstein was the wish to participate in the Summer Olympic Games and Winter Olympic Games in Germany in the year 1936. Through the engagement of Baron Eduard von Falz-Fein the first NOC of Liechtenstein was founded to meet the formal requirements given by the IOC for the participation in the Olympic Games. This step was successful and for the first time a delegation of two athletes, three shooters and one cyclist was sent to Berlin in the summer to participate in their first Olympic Games for Liechtenstein. In the following Winter Games another delegation with two alpine skiers and one two-man bobsleigh team was sent to represent Liechtenstein. Since then Liechtenstein participated in almost all Winter and Summer Olympic Games.

See also
 Liechtenstein at the Olympics

Sources
 Julia Frick und Wolfgang Vogt (2011). 75 Jahre Sport in Liechtenstein. Liechtensteinischer Olympischer Sportverband (LOSV).

External links
 Official website

Liechtenstein
Olympic
Liechtenstein at the Olympics
1935 establishments in Liechtenstein
Sports organizations established in 1935